The Anglican Diocese of Dutse is one of eleven within the Anglican Province of Kaduna, itself one of 14 provinces within the Church of Nigeria. The current bishop is Markus Yohanna Danbinta

Notes

Dioceses of the Province of Kaduna
 
Dutse